A palace is a grand residence, especially a royal residence, or the home of a head of state or some other high-ranking dignitary, such as a bishop or archbishop. The word is derived from the Latin name palātium, for Palatine Hill in Rome which housed the Imperial residences. Most European languages have a version of the term (palais, palazzo, palacio, etc.), and many use it for a wider range of buildings than English. In many parts of Europe, the equivalent term is also applied to large private houses in cities, especially of the aristocracy; often the term for a large country house is different. Many historic palaces are now put to other uses such as parliaments, museums, hotels, or office buildings. The word is also sometimes used to describe a lavishly ornate building used for public entertainment or exhibitions such as a movie palace.

 A palace is distinguished from a castle while the latter clearly is fortified or has the style of a fortification, whereas a palace does not.

Etymology

The word palace comes from Old French palais (imperial residence), from Latin Palātium, the name of one of the seven hills of Rome. The original "palaces" on the Palatine Hill were the seat of the imperial power while the "capitol" on the Capitoline Hill was the religious nucleus of Rome. Long after the city grew to the seven hills the Palatine remained a desirable residential area. Emperor Caesar Augustus lived there in a purposely modest house only set apart from his neighbours by the two laurel trees planted to flank the front door as a sign of triumph granted by the Senate. His descendants, especially Nero with his "Domus Aurea" (the Golden House), enlarged the building and its grounds over and over until it took up the hill top. The word Palātium came to mean the residence of the emperor rather than the neighbourhood on top of the hill.

Palace meaning "government" can be recognized in a remark of Paul the Deacon, writing c. AD 790 and describing events of the 660s: "When Grimuald set out for Beneventum, he entrusted his palace to Lupus" (Historia Langobardorum, V.xvii). At the same time, Charlemagne was consciously reviving the Roman expression in his "palace" at Aachen, of which only his chapel remains. In the 9th century, the "palace" indicated the housing of the government too, and the constantly travelling Charlemagne built fourteen. In the early Middle Ages, the palas was usually that part of an imperial palace (or Kaiserpfalz), that housed the Great Hall, where affairs of state were conducted; it continued to be used as the seat of government in some German cities. In the Holy Roman Empire the powerful independent Electors came to be housed in palaces (Paläste). This has been used as evidence that power was widely distributed in the Empire; as in more centralized monarchies, only the monarch's residence would be a palace.

In modern times, the term has been applied by archaeologists and historians to large structures that housed combined ruler, court and bureaucracy in "palace cultures". In informal usage, the term "palace" can be extended to a grand residence of any kind.

Ancient palaces

Early ancient palaces include the Assyrian palaces at Nimrud and Nineveh, the Minoan palace at Knossos, and the Persian palaces at Persepolis and Susa. Palaces in East Asia, such as the imperial palaces of Japan, Korea, Vietnam, Thailand, Indonesia, and large wooden structures in China's Forbidden City, consist of many low pavilions surrounded by vast, walled gardens, in contrast to the single building palaces of Medieval Western Europe.
Palaces were also built by post-classical African kingdoms such as the Ashanti Empire. Before its destruction during the Third Anglo-Ashanti War, the Ashanti royal palace at Kumasi, Ghana was described by English explorers Thomas Edward Bowdich and Winwood Reade as "an immense building of a variety of oblong courts and regular squares".

Medieval palaces

Islamic Lands

Americas

Brazil

The Brazilian new capital, Brasília, hosts modern palaces, most designed by the city's architect Oscar Niemeyer. The Alvorada Palace is the official residence of Brazil's president. The Planalto Palace is the official workplace. The Jaburu Palace is the official residence of Brazil's vice-president. Also Rio de Janeiro, the former capital of the Portuguese Empire and the Empire of Brazil, houses numerous royal and imperial palaces as the Imperial Palace of São Cristóvão, former official residence of the Brazil's Emperors, the Paço Imperial, its official workplace and the Guanabara Palace, former residence of Isabel, Princess Imperial of Brazil besides palaces of the nobility and aristocracy. The city of Petropolis, in the state of Rio de Janeiro, is particularly known for its palaces of the imperial period such as the Petrópolis Palace and the Grão-Pará Palace.

Canada

In Canada, Government House is a title given to the official residences of the Canadian monarchy and various viceroys (the governor generals and the lieutenant governors). Though not universal, in most cases the title is also the building's sole name; for example, the sovereign's and governor general's principal residence in Ottawa is known as Government House only in formal contexts, being more generally referred to as Rideau Hall. The use of the term Government House is an inherited custom from the British Empire, where there were and are many government houses.

Rideau Hall is, since 1867, the official residence in Ottawa of both the Canadian monarch and his or her representative, the Governor General of Canada, and has been described as "Canada's house". It stands in Canada's capital on a  estate at 1 Sussex Drive, with the main building consisting of approximately 175 rooms across , and 27 outbuildings around the grounds. While the equivalent building in many countries has a prominent, central place in the national capital, Rideau Hall's site is relatively unobtrusive within Ottawa, giving it more the character of a private home.

Along with Rideau Hall, the Citadelle of Quebec, also known as La Citadelle, is an active military installation and official residence of both the Canadian monarch and the Governor General. It is located atop Cap Diamant, adjoining the Plains of Abraham in Quebec City, Quebec. The citadel is the oldest military building in Canada, and forms part of the fortifications of Quebec City, which is one of only two cities in North America still surrounded by fortifications. The fortress is located within the historic district of Old Québec, which was designated a World Heritage Site in 1985.

In addition to the federal residences, most provinces maintain a residence for the Canadian monarch, as well as their provincial viceroys lieutenant-governors. There is no government house for the Lieutenant Governors of Ontario (repurposed in 1937 and demolished in 1961), Quebec (destroyed by fire in 1966), or Alberta (closed in 1938 and repurchased and repurposed in 1964).

Mexico

The capital of Mexico, Mexico City, is traditionally nicknamed the "City of Palaces"; a nickname usually attributed to Alexander von Humboldt after he visited the city in the late 18th century and early 19th century, but originally coined by Charles Latrobe, an English traveller who visited Mexico City in 1834 and "got the feeling of living a dream".

In Central Mexico, the Aztec emperors built many palaces in the capital of their empire, Tenochtitlan (modern-day Mexico City), some of which may still be seen. On observing the great city Hernán Cortés wrote, "There are, in all districts of this great city, many temples or palaces,... They are all very beautiful buildings. Amongst these temples there is one, the principal one, whose great size and magnificence no human tongue could describe,... All round inside this wall there are very elegant quarters with very large rooms and corridors. There are as many as forty towers, all of which are so high that in the case of the largest there are fifty steps leading up to the main part of it and the most important of these towers is higher than that of the cathedral of Seville..."

In the Yucatan, a well-preserved Mayan palace with a unique four storey observation tower stands at the Palenque site, from where Pakal reigned over the city-state.

The National Palace, or Palacio Nacional, located in Mexico City's main square, the Plaza de la Constitución (El Zócalo), first built in 1563, is in the heart of the Mexican capital. In 1821, the palace was given its current name and the executive, legislative, and judicial branches of government were housed in the palace; the latter two branches would eventually reside elsewhere. During the Second Mexican Empire, its name was changed, for a time, to the Imperial Palace. The National Palace continues to be the official seat of the executive authority, though it is no longer the official residence of the President.

Also in Mexico City is the Castillo de Chapultepec, or Chapultepec Castle, located in the middle of Chapultepec Park which currently houses the Mexican National Museum of History. It is the only castle, or palace, in North America that was occupied by sovereigns – Emperor Maximilian I of Mexico, a member of the House of Habsburg and his consort, Empress Carlota of Mexico, daughter of Leopold I of Belgium. The palace features many objets d'art ranging from gifts of Napoleon III to paintings by Franz Xaver Winterhalter and Mexican painter Santiago Rebull.

United States

Palaces in the United States include the White House, the official residence of the President, and the official residences of many governors and Roman Catholic bishops. Some palaces of former heads of state or their representatives, such English and Spanish Royal Governors and the Hawaiian Royal Family still exist.

Examples include: ʻIolani Palace and Hānaiakamalama, the former homes of the Hawaiian monarchs in Honolulu; Hulihee Palace in Kailua-Kona, Hawaii; The Governor's Palace in Williamsburg, a modern reconstruction of the official residence of the Royal governors of the Colony of Virginia; Tryon Palace in New Bern, a modern reconstruction of the historical colonial governors' palace of the Province of North Carolina; and the Palace of the Governors in Santa Fe, New Mexico as well as the Spanish Governor's Palace in San Antonio, Texas, which were residences of both Spanish and Mexican governors.

There are many private buildings or mansions in the United States, which, though not called "palaces", have the grandeur typical of a palace, and which have been used as residences. Hearst Castle and the Biltmore Estate are examples.

Uruguay
The Palacio Legislativo (Legislative Palace) is the house of the Uruguayan Parliament.

Venezuela
The Palacio de Miraflores is the setting for the offices of the president of the country.

Africa

Ethiopia
Located in Addis Ababa, the Menelik Palace is a palatial compound that is currently serving as the residence of the Prime Minister of Ethiopia. The compound, while containing palaces and residences also contains a few churches, tombs and monasteries. Previously, it served as the seat of the Emperors of Ethiopia. After a 2018 renovation, the compound opened to the public in 2019 as a part of Unity Park.

Nigeria

The Palace of the Olowo, ruler of the Yoruba Owo clan of Nigeria, is acknowledged to be the largest palace in all of Africa. It consists of more than 100 courtyards, each with a unique traditional usage.

In the Kano State of Nigeria, the Gidan Rumfa acts as the seat of the Emir of Kano since the late 15th century when it was constructed. 

In Benin City, the capital of the Edo State, lies the current Royal Palace of the Oba of Benin. It currently houses the Oba of Benin, who is the traditional ruler of the Edo people, alongside some other royals. The current palace is a reconstruction by Eweka II after the original was destroyed in 1897 by the British.

Rwanda 

Rwanda is host to 3 palaces, though one of them is currently repurposed. In Nyanza, the former royal capital of the Kingdom of Rwanda, are 2 existing palaces. The first, the traditional King's Palace is constructed in the vernacular style and housed the traditional ruler of Rwanda, the Mwami. A second palace for the king exists in Nyanza, though it is constructed in the art deco style as opposed to the local construction style. A third palace, the Rwesero Palace was originally constructed for Mutara III, but he dies before it's completion and the building was converted into the Rwesero Art Museum.

Uganda
The Kabakas Palace belonged to the Kingdom of Buganda and is a known landmark of the present capital Kampala.

Asia

Afghanistan

Afghanistan's capital Kabul is well known for its sheer number of palaces. Many had been built in the 19th century but perhaps the most famous is the Darul Aman Palace. Many palaces were damaged by the civil war, including Darul Aman, but others have survived or have been rebuilt.

Armenia

Armenia has many palaces from its various historical periods. The Erebuni fortress in Yerevan has a grand royal palace constructed in 782 B.C. by King Argisthi. The palace at Erebuni is one of the earliest examples of an Urartian palace.

During the Kingdom of Armenia (antiquity), many palaces were constructed for the successive kings. Ruins of a royal palace can be found in the early Armenian capital of Yervandashat, which was built to serve as the seat of Orontid Armenian Kings by Orontes IV. During the period of the Artaxiad Dynasty of Armenia, emperor king Tigranes the great constructed a grand persianate palace in the newly built city of Tigranocerta. The purpose of the Armenian Temple of Garni is still up for debate, however, certain scholars attest that following the Christianization of Armenia in the 4th century BC, the temple was converted into a summer palace for Khosrovidukht (sister of Tiridates III of Armenia) by the Arsacid dynasty of Armenia.

After the fall of the Arsacids, Armenia was ruled by a succession of aristocratic families called Nakharar. One of these Nakharar princes, Grigor Mamikonian, built a palace in the citadel of Aruch near the Aruchavank cathedral, some walls of this palace and a unique Armenian throne made of tufa still survive today.

The Medieval capital of the Bagratid kingdom of Armenia, Ani, also hosted many palaces. The first palace of Ani, constructed by the princely Armenian Kamsarakan dynasty in the seventh century, served as the most important structure of the city. Located in the main citadel, the Kamsarakan palace was used by the successive Bagratid kingdom as their headquarters. In addition, Ani hosted several other palaces such as the Merchant’s(Tigran Honents) Palace, one of the best surviving examples of secular Armenian architecture of that time, the Seljuk palace, and the Manuchir Mosque, which is said by some historians to have been a residence of Bagratid kings before being converted to a mosque.

After the Bagratid state was conquered by the Byzantines and then the Seljuks, Armenia was once again liberated by the royal Zakarian family under Georgian Queen Tamar. This period of Zakarid Armenia brought forth many palaces as well, the most notable of which being Amberd Fortress and the 12th century palace in Dashtadem Fortress. The Zakarids became vassals of the Mongols, however, following their collapse, a succession of nomadic Turkic empires came to rule the region.

During the various periods of Ottoman and Iranian occupation following the Timurid Empire, Armenia was governed by several local principalities known as Melikdoms. Each Melik had their own princely palace. The most notable of which is the Palace of the Dizak Melikdom constructed by Melik Yeganyan in Togh (1737). Other notable melik palaces are the Melik Ahnazar palace in Khnatsakh (16th century), the Melik Haykaz Palace in Melikashen (15th century), the Melik Kasu palace, the palace of the Melik-Barkhudaryans in Tegh (1783) and Halidzor Fortress (17th century), which served as a palace for the Melik Parsadanian family.

Azerbaijan

Azerbaijan has a number of palaces which belong to different ages. For example, there are palaces from the BC era and from the 12th century, like the "Goyalp" Palace of Eldiguzids Empire Atabeg — located in Nakhchivan city and was built in 1130s.

Baku Khans' Palace is a complex of several houses belonged to members of ruling family of Baku Khanate in 17th century. The palace complex was in ruins but has now been reconstructed as of 2018. Official Administration of State Historical-Architectural Reserve "Icheri Sheher has opened the complex as a palace-museum.

The Palace of Happiness (Azerbaijani: Səadət Sarayı), currently also called Palace of Marriage Registrations and previously called Mukhtarov Palace, is a historic building in the center of Baku, Azerbaijan, built in Neo-Gothic style in the early 19th century.

Shahbulag Castle Palace (Azerbaijani: Şahbulaq qalası "Spring of the Shah"), is an 18th-century fortress in near Aghdam. After the death of Turkic ruler Nadir Shah, the territory that is nowadays Azerbaijan split into several Caucasian khanates one of which was the Karabakh Khanate founded by Panah Ali Khan. The first capital of the khanate was the Bayat Castle built in 1748

Haji Gayib's Palace – is an ancient fortress construction near a coastal side of Icheri Sheher. It is located in Baku quarter of Icheri Sheher, opposite the Maiden Tower. History of the palace is dated back to the 15th century. Intake portal of the bathhouse is rectangular shaped

The Palace of Shaki Khans (Azerbaijani: Şəki xanlarının sarayı) in Shaki, Azerbaijan was a summer residence of Shaki Khans. It was built in 1797 by Muhammed Hasan Khan. Along with its pool and plane trees, the summer residence is the only remaining structure from the larger palatial complex inside the Sheki Khans' Fortress, which once included a winter palace, residences for the Khan's family and servants' quarters. It features decorative tiles, fountains and several stained-glass windows. The exterior was decorated with dark blue, turquoise and ochre tiles in geometric patterns and the murals were coloured with tempera and were inspired by the works of Nizami Ganjavi.

These are located in various regions and capital of Azerbaijan – the palace of government:
 Residence of Zagulba (510s) is the world's oldest presidential house and full-time residence of the President of Azerbaijan in Baku.
 Bika Khanum Saray (1390–1394) Full-time residence of the President of Azerbaijan in Baku.
 Bullur Palace (1740) residence of the President of Azerbaijan, and Chairmen of the Supreme Majlis of Nakhchivan Autonomous Republic in Sharur District.
 Asena Palace (1804) Full-time residence of the President of Azerbaijan in Baku.
 Göy Saray (Blue) (1810s) Rest residence of the President of Azerbaijan in Baku
 Palace of White Horse (1933) was the old rest palace for members of Political Bureau in Shamkir
 Government House (1936) is a government building palace various state ministries of Azerbaijan
 Administrational Palace (1970s)
 Gulustan Palace (1973) Full-time and feast residence of the President of Azerbaijan in Baku.
 Ghazan Khan Palace (2006) Residence of the President of Azerbaijan in Baku.
 Vahdat Presidential Summer Palace (2007) in Shamakhi
 Presidential Mountain Palace (2013) Rest residence of the President of Azerbaijan in Qabala

Brunei
Istana Nurul Iman is the world's largest residential palace and is the official residence of the Sultan of Brunei, Hassanal Bolkiah, and the seat of the Brunei government. The palace is located on a leafy sprawl of hills on the banks of the Brunei River, a few kilometres south of Bandar Seri Begawan, Brunei's capital.

Bangladesh 

Most of the Palaces in Bangladesh are built by the Zamindars and Nawabs of British Bengal. Many magnificent palaces are found across the country. Among them Ahsan Manzil (also known as Pink Palace) built by the Nawabs of Dhaka, Tajhat Palace of Rangpur, Natore Palace, Puthia Rajbari of Rajshahi, Rose Garden Palace of Old Dhaka, Baliati Palace of Manikganj, Shashi Lodge of Mymensingh and Bangabhaban (Presidential Palace) are notable one.

China

A famed example of Chinese palaces is the Forbidden City, the imperial palace of the Chinese Empire from the Ming dynasty (since the Yongle Emperor) to the end of the Qing dynasty. Located in Beijing, it is the largest palace complex currently in existence in the world. The palace complex exemplifies traditional Chinese palatial architecture. Another example is the Summer Palace located in the northern suburb of Beijing and the Mukden Palace in Shenyang. The Presidential Palace in Nanjing and Imperial Palace of Manchukuo in Changchun display European architectural influences.

The Weiyang Palace built during the Han dynasty was the largest palace complex ever built in the world, but it was destroyed during the Tang dynasty.

Chinese palaces are designed in regular square grids and arranged in a formal layout consisting of main buildings and a number of pavilions enclosed within walls. Unlike massive single-structured European palaces or castles, Chinese palaces are a multitude of complexes containing several larger and smaller structures with parks and courtyards.

India

India is home to many palaces and vast empires. Its history is full of numerous dynasties that have ruled over various parts of the country. While most monuments of the ancient period have been destroyed or lie in ruins, some medieval buildings have been maintained or restored to good condition. Several medieval forts and palaces still stand all over India. These are examples of the achievements of the architects and engineers of that age. The palaces of India offer an insight into the life of the royalty of the country. While some royal palaces have been maintained as museums or hotels over the last decades, some are still homes for the members of the erstwhile royal families. These forts and palaces are the largest illustrations and legacy of the princely states of India. They feature floats of flowers in grand fountains, shimmering blue water of magnificent baths and private pools, doric pillars, ornamental brackets, decorative staircases, and light streaming in through large windows. India possesses some of the most fascinating forts and palaces, a true royal retreat. It is not just a romantic longing for a royal experience, but also the search for the truly authentic Indian experience that brings thousands of heritage lovers to India's palaces.

Rajasthan has many forts and palaces that are major tourist destinations in North India. (See List of palaces in Rajasthan.) The Rajputs (collective term for the rulers of the region) were known as brave soldiers who preferred to die than be taken prisoners. They were also great connoisseurs of art and brilliant builders. The most famous forts and palaces in Rajasthan are located in Chittor, Jodhpur, Jaipur, Udaipur, Saphieree, Amber and Nahargarh. Taj Hotels Resorts and Palaces manages some of the most iconic palaces of the region, Lake Palace, Udaipur; Umaid Bhawan Palace, Jodhpur; Fort Madhogarh, Jaipur and Rambagh Palace, Jaipur; and offer authentic royal retreats to the guests in all its grandeur, splendour and magnificence.

Kolkata is known as the City of Palaces within the Indian context, referring to the numerous grand residential buildings that dotted the city from the end of the 18th century onwards, as it grew to become one of the largest cities of the British Raj.

Karnataka is famous for the Amba Vilas Palace (commonly known as Mysore Palace) in Mysuru / Mysore, which was the palace of the Wodeyar kings. It was said to have been built of wood until it had to be rebuilt after a fire that burned down the entire palace complex.

Indonesia

In Indonesia, palaces are known as istana (Malay and Indonesian), or kraton (Javanese and Sundanese). In Bali the royal palace compound is called puri. The palaces reflect the long history and diverse culture of the Indonesian archipelago.

Although Indonesia is now a republic, some of its parts and provinces still retain and preserve their traditional royal heritage, for example the Sultanate of Yogyakarta, Surakarta, Mangkunegaran princedom, Kasepuhan palace in Cirebon, and Kutai in East Kalimantan. Remnants of palaces and royal houses still can be found in Banten, Medan, Ternate, Bima, Bali and Sumenep.
The layout of traditional Balinese and Javanese kratons is similar to the Chinese concept of walled compounds of royal pavilions, squares and gardens. Most of these kratons took the form of wooden pavilions called pendopo, while the istana of Sumatra usually consist of a single large structure. Typical Minangkabau vernacular architecture can be found in Pagaruyung Palace, West Sumatra. An example of Malay palace is Istana Maimun in Medan.

During VOC and the colonial era of the Dutch East Indies, the colonial government built several European stately palaces as the residence of the Governor General. Most of these European palaces have now become the state palace of the Republic of Indonesia. Indonesian state palaces are the neoclassic Merdeka Palace and Bogor Palace.

Iran

Niavarān Palace Complex is a historical complex situated in the northern part of Tehran, Iran. It consists of several buildings and a museum. The Sahebqraniyeh Palace, from the time of Naser al-Din Shah of the Qajar dynasty, is also inside this complex. The main Niavaran Palace, completed in 1968, was the primary residence of the last shah, Mohammad Reza Pahlavi and the Imperial family until the Iranian Revolution. The main palace was designed by the Iranian architect Mohsen Foroughi.

Israel
The pre-Israelite Canaanite site of Tel Kabri, destroyed ca 1600 BCE, was built around a palace core. Though palace culture of ancient Israel and Judea can be inferred through the Hebrew Bible, no palace of Solomon or David has been securely identified. In Israel there are many ancient palaces like the Masada. In Roman Judaea palaces of the Herodian line of client-kings have been identified at several sites, including the main palace at Jerusalem and a winter palace at Herodium, in the Judean desert. Herod's palace at Caesarea Maritima preserved its palatial function as the official residence of the Roman procurators and governors of Judaea.  There are other palaces in the Old City of Jerusalem, such as the Lady Tonsok Palace.

In Israel there are a number of magnificent buildings that are not considered "palaces", but they have the grandeur of a typical palace, and serve as residences, such as the House of Yehudayoff Hefetz, and the Sergei courtyard in Jerusalem.

Japan

Of the palaces in Japan, many of them are located in Tokyo, such as the Tokyo Imperial Palace, which houses Japan’s royal family. The Imperial palace was built on the site of Edo Castle. Other Japanese palaces are located in Kyoto, the former capital of Japan. Most Japanese palaces are built in a "castle" style formation, as a large pagoda. This helps reinforce the palace from earthquakes.

Korea

Korea has used many palaces since the ancient times, although many were destroyed. Palaces were built within, but not limited to Seoul, Kaeseong, Pyeongyang, Gyeongju, and Buyeo, as well as in various cities located outside of modern Korea. Today, only Joseon Dyansty palaces are still intact, even then, very downsized due to years of colonialism, war, and neglect. The most emblematic of these surviving palaces is the Gyeongbokgung, the primary palace of the Joseon Dynasty. Other examples include the Changdeokgung, Changgyeonggung, Deoksugung, and Gyeonghuigung. All of these are from the Joseon Dynasty and survive to this day, though many had to be reconstructed during the recent decades following their destruction during the colonial period. Other famous examples include the Manwoldae, the palace of the Goryeo Dynasty located in Kaeseong, the Banwolseong, the palace of Silla located in Gyeongju, and Anhak Palace, the palace of Goguryeo located in Pyeongyang.

Lebanon

Palaces have existed in Lebanon since the time of the Phoenicians. Almost all of the palaces of Ancient Phoenicia have been destroyed.

During the Renaissance palaces were built in Lebanon, especially in the Chouf region of Mount Lebanon. Lebanese palaces are very diverse architecturally, being influenced by Arabs, Italians, French, Persians, Turkish and East Asians. This is seen in the Beiteddine Palace, which is a mixture of traditional Lebanese, Italian, Arabic and Persian architecture.

Today in Lebanon there are at least ten buildings that can be classified as palaces, including the Beiteddine Palace, Grand Serail (one of the largest in the world), Baabda Palace, Sursock Museum, and Fakhreddine Palace.

Malaysia

Malaysia, a constituent of nine states, is ruled by hereditary sultans. Every five years, one sultan is elected as Yang di-Pertuan Agong (Supreme King), the head of state of Malaysia. The Yang di-Pertuan Agong has a palace, referred to as an istana. Each of the other sultans has their own istana, located in their state. Throughout the country they are sometimes called Istana Hinggap.

The Yang di-Pertuan Agong's official residences are the Istana Negara, Jalan Duta, the Royal Museum, and Istana Melawati, a palace and retreat, located in Putrajaya. Some of the other official palaces are the Istana Besar, Istana Anak Bukit, Istana Pekan, Istana Maziah, Istana Alam Shah, Istana Balai Besar, Istana Besar Seri Menanti, Istana Iskandariah and Istana Arau. Several appointed governors, or Yang di-Pertua Negeri, are also assigned to have their official seat and residence such as The Astana, Istana Negeri Sabah and Seri Mutiara.

Nepal
Singha Durbar (literally, Lion Palace) in Kathmandu is the official seat of government of Nepal.

Narayanhiti Palace Museum was a residence and principal workplace of the reigning Monarch of the Kingdom of Nepal. It was built by king Mahendra in 1961 under the design of Californian architect Benjamin Polk. After the 2006 revolution, this royal palace is turned into a public museum.

Older palaces include the Durbar Squares, which are enlisted as UNESCO World Heritage Sites. They are located in Kathmandu Valley in districts of Kathmandu, Bhaktapur and Lalitpur. In Kathmandu is Kathmandu Durbar Square, Bhaktapur Durbar Square in Bhaktapur, Patan Durbar Square in Lalitpur.

Kathmandu Durbar Square (Basantapur Darbar Kshetra) in front of the old royal palace of the former Kathmandu Kingdom is one of three Durbar (royal palace) Squares in the Kathmandu Valley in Nepal, all of which are UNESCO World Heritage Sites.

Several buildings in the Square collapsed due to a major earthquake on 25 April 2015. Durbar Square was surrounded with spectacular architecture and vividly showcases the skills of the Newar artists and craftsmen over several centuries. The Royal Palace was originally at Dattaraya square and was later moved to Durbar square.

The Kathmandu Durbar Square held the palaces of the Malla and Shah kings who ruled over the city. Along with these palaces, the square surrounds quadrangles, revealing courtyards and temples. It is known as Hanuman Dhoka Durbar Square, a name derived from a statue of Hanuman, the monkey devotee of Lord Ram, at the entrance of the palace.
 

Bhaktapur Durbar Square is the plaza in front of the royal palace of the old Bhaktapur Kingdom. It is also a UNESCO World Heritage Site.

The Bhaktapur Durbar Square is located in the current town of Bhaktapur, also known as Bhadgaon, which lies 13 km east of Kathmandu. While the complex consists of at least four distinct squares (Durbar Square, Taumadhi Square, Dattatreya Square and Pottery Square), the whole area is informally known as the Bhakapur Durbar Square and is a highly visited site in the Kathmandu Valley. This palace consists of 55 windows so it is also known as '55 Windowed Palace'.

Patan Durbar Square is situated at the centre of the city of Lalitpur in Nepal. It is also one of the three Durbar Squares in the Kathmandu Valley, all of which are UNESCO World Heritage Sites. One of its attraction is the ancient royal palace where the Malla Kings of Lalitpur resided.

The Durbar Square is a marvel of Newa architecture. The Square floor is tiled with red bricks. There are many temples and idols in the area. The main temples are aligned opposite of the western face of the palace. The entrance of the temples faces east, towards the palace. There is also a bell situated in the alignment beside the main temples. The Square also holds old Newari residential houses. There are various other temples and structures in and around Patan Durbar Square built by the Newa People.

Philippines

In pre-Hispanic Philippines, Filipinos built large wooden residences for the ancient nobility and royalty (such as Lakans, Wangs, rajahs and datus) called Torogan or Bahay Lakan ("king's house"). The windows of torogan are slits and richly framed in wood panels with okir designs located in front of the house. The communal kitchen is half a meter lower than the main house is both used for cooking and eating. The distinct high gable roof of the torogan, thin at the apex and gracefully flaring out to the eaves, sits on a huge structures enclosed by slabs of timber and lifted more than two meters above the ground by a huge trunk of a tree that was set on a rock. The end floor beams lengthen as panolongs the seemed to lift up the whole house. The torogan is suffused with decorations. There were diongal at the apex of the roof, also an intricately carved tinai a walai, okir designs in the floor, on windows and on panolongs.

The people in the Southern part of Philippines, built the same wooden palaces such as langgal of Tausug. In the Sultanate of Sulu, a palace was built for the Sultans which has the name Astana Darul Jambangan (white adobe) which has been destroyed by a typhoon in 1912. A replica of the royal palace was rebuilt as an attraction in Mt. Bayug Eco-Cultural Park in the town of Talipao, Sulu.

During the Spanish Era, the government of the Spanish East Indies built a succession of palaces in and around Manila for high colonial officials and religious authorities. The most famous of these is the 18th-century Malacañang Palace, which originally housed Spanish and American Governors-General and, since the Commonwealth, the President of the Philippines.

Former president and strongman Ferdinand Marcos had Coconut Palace constructed in 1978 to showcase the country's varied uses for the coconut. It serves as the home and office of the vice-president. In 2004, President Gloria Macapagal Arroyo converted the former Aduana (customs house) in Cebu City into a small palace, called Malacañang sa Sugbo.

Thailand

Vietnam

Europe

Belgium
The city of Bruges:

The Gruuthusemuseum is a museum of applied arts in Bruges, located in the medieval Gruuthuse, the Palace of Louis de Gruuthuse. The collection ranges from the 15th to the 19th century.

Presumably in the 13th century, a rich family from Bruges received the monopoly to levy taxes on gruit, and built a storage for it. The building was changed in the early fifteenth century by Jan IV van der Aa to a luxury house for his family, which subsequently changes its name to "Van Gruuthuse" ("From the Gruit house"). His son Louis de Gruuthuse adds a second wing to the house, and in 1472 a chapel. This connects the house to the adjacent Church of Our Lady, Bruges.

The city of Mechelen houses several palaces intra muros:

"Hof van Kamerijk" or "Palace of Margaret of York", 15th-century building. Also called "Keizershof" (English; literally "Emperor's Court") because several royal children resided here and received education at this court, including Charles V (Holy Roman Emperor and Archduke of Austria, King of Spain and Duke of Burgundy)

"Hof van Savoye" or "Palace of Margaret of Austria", early 16th-century building and one of the first Renaissance buildings in northern Europe.

The "Hof van Busleyden", early 16th-century Renaissance palace of Hieronymus van Busleyden; The "Archbishop 's palace", 18th-century building and the official seat of the Archbishop of the Roman Catholic province Belgium; The "Hof van Palermo", 15th-century palace of Jan I Carondelet ; The "Hof van Hoogstraten", 16th-century palace of Antoon I van Lalaing; The "Hof van Nassau", 15th-century building which served as temporary court of Margaret of York when she arrived in Mechelen after her marriage with Charles the Bold; The "Hof van Cortenbach", 16th-century building; The "Hof van Coloma", 18th-century palace of Jean Ernest Coloma, Baron of St-Pieters Leeuw and member of the Coloma family

The city of Brussels has also several remaining and notable palaces intra muros: "The Royal Palace of Brussels", the official palace of the King and Queen of the Belgians, The Egmont palace, The Palace of Prince Charles Alexander Emanuel of Lorraine and Hotel Errera.

France

In France there has been a clear distinction between a château and a palais. The palace has always been urban, like the Palais de la Cité in Paris, which was the royal palace of France and is now the supreme court of justice of France, or the palace of the Popes at Avignon.

The château, by contrast, has always been in rural settings, supported by its demesne, even when it was no longer actually fortified. Speakers of English think of the "Palace of Versailles" because it was the residence of the king of France, and the king was the source of power, though the building has always remained the Château de Versailles for the French, and the seat of government under the Ancien Régime remained the Palais du Louvre. The Louvre had begun as a fortified Château du Louvre on the edge of Paris, but as the seat of government and shorn of its fortified architecture and then completely surrounded by the city, it developed into the Palais du Louvre.

The hôtel particulier remains the term for an urban residence sited entre cour et jardin, behind a forecourt and opening onto a garden; when fronting directly on streets, they are maisons, "houses".  Bishops always had a palais in the town of their diocese, an hôtel in other towns, though they might possess chateaux.

The usage is essentially the same in Italy, Spain and Portugal, as well as the former Austrian Empire.  In Vienna, Austria, all large mansions belonging to aristocratic or very wealthy families were traditionally called palais, but this never applied to imperial palaces themselves which were called Burg within the city and Schloss when outside it.  In Germany, the wider term was a relatively recent importation and was used rather more restrictively.

Germany

The German term for "palace" is Palast, which is used especially for large palatial complexes and gardens.  Large country houses are typically called schloss (chateaux or castle in English).

Germany offers a variety of more than 25,000 castles and palaces and thousands of manor houses. The country is known for its fairy tale-like scenery palatial buildings, such as Sanssouci, Linderhof Palace, Herrenchiemsee, Schwetzingen, Nordkirchen and Schwerin Palace. Many of these buildings have a history of over 1000 years, ranging from fortifications to royal residences. Many German castles after the middle ages were mainly built as royal or ducal palaces rather than as a fortified building.

Greece

The best examples of the Bronze Age Greece palace are seen in the excavations at Mycenae, Tiryns and Pylos. That these were administrative centers is shown by the records found there. From an architectural point of view, they were the heirs of the Minoan palaces and also of other palaces built earlier on the Greek mainland. They were ranged around a group of courtyards each opening upon several rooms of different dimensions, such as storerooms and workshops, as well as reception halls and living quarters. The heart of the palace was the megaron. This was the throne room, laid out around a circular hearth surrounded by four columns, the throne generally being found on the right-hand side upon entering the room. The staircases found in the palace of Pylos indicate palaces had two stories. Located on the top floor were probably the private quarters of the royal family and some storerooms. These palaces have yielded a wealth of artifacts and fragmentary frescoes.

Hungary

In Hungary distinction is made between urban and rural residencies. Only the urban residencies of the higher aristocracy were called palota (palace), rural stately homes were named kastély (mansion), or in case of smaller country houses kúria. Noble landowner families, like the House of Esterházy, often had several mansions in the countryside and palaces in towns. The office of the President of the Republic of Hungary, Sándor Palace was the residence of the Sándor family in the 19th century. Royal residencies were also called palaces, for example, the Early Renaissance summer palace of King Matthias Corvinus in Visegrád or Buda Castle which was called Királyi-palota (Royal Palace). In the second half of the 19th century splendid new townhouses of the bourgeoisie on Andrássy út and elsewhere in Budapest were named palaces. A typical example is the Art Nouveau Gresham Palace which was built by an insurance company. Grand public buildings and even blocks of flats of higher standard were regularly called palaces (the contemporary term of the latter were bérpalota meaning rent palace). For contemporary buildings the term is seldom used with the notable exemption of the Palace of Arts.

Ireland
In Ireland, the term "palace" is rarely used. The main royal residence in Ireland, Dublin Castle, was never called a palace, nor is Hillsborough Castle, the main royal residence of Northern Ireland.

The word "palace" is largely restricted to large official dwellings for Church of Ireland bishops:
Bishop's Palace at Achadh Úr (modern Freshford), home of the medieval Bishop of Freshford
Braganza, Carlow, home of the Bishops of Kildare and Leighlin
Archbishop’s Palace, Cashel, County Tipperary, home of the Archbishop of Cashel and Emly; built in 1732, now the Cashel Palace Hotel.
Bishop's Palace, Cork, home of the Bishop of Cork, Cloyne and Ross
The Palace, Cobh, former home of the Bishop of Cloyne
Palace of the Archbishop of Dublin at Saint Sepulchre’s, former home of the Archbishop of Dublin
 Bishop’s Palace at Elphin, former home of the Bishop of Elphin
Bishop's Palace, Ennis, also called Westbourne, home of the Bishop of Killaloe.
Bishop's Palace of Kilkenny, a summer house for the Bishops of Ossory, built by Richard Pococke
Bishop's Palace, Killarney, former home of the Bishop of Ardfert and Aghadoe
Bishop's Palace, Kilmore, County Cavan, also called the "See House", home of the Bishop of Kilmore.
Bishop's Palace, Limerick, former home of the Bishop of Limerick
Church of Ireland Bishop's Palace, Raphoe
Archbishop’s Palace, Tuam, built in 1678 and burnt in 1691; Grove House now stands on the site. Saint Jarlath's, built c.1870, later served as archbishop's palace.
Bishop's Palace Waterford, formerly home of the Bishop of Waterford and Lismore 
Archbishop's Palace, Armagh, formerly home of Archbishop of Armagh

There are also some Catholic bishops' palaces:
Bishop's Palace, Ballina, County Mayo, home of the Catholic Bishop of Killala.
Bishop’s Palace, Cork, on Redemption Road, home of the Roman Catholic Bishop of Cork and Ross.
Archbishop's Palace, Drumcondra, home of the Roman Catholic Archbishop of Dublin. It is today referred to as simply the Archbishop's House.
Bishop's Palace, Longford, home of the Bishop of Ardagh and Clonmacnoise.
Roman Catholic Bishop's Palace, Mullingar, dwelling of the Roman Catholic Bishop of Meath
Roman Catholic Bishop’s Palace, Raphoe
Archbishop's Palace, Thurles, dwelling of the Catholic Archbishop of Cashel and Emly.

Italy

In Italy, any urban building built as a grand residence is a palazzo; these are often no larger than a Victorian townhouse.  It was not necessary to be a nobleman for one's house to be considered a palazzo; the hundreds of palazzi in Venice nearly all belonged to the patrician class of the city. In the Middle Ages these also functioned as warehouses and places of business, as well as homes.  Each family's palazzo was a hive that contained all the family members, though it might not always show a grand architectural public front. In the 20th century, palazzo in Italian came to apply by extension to any large fine apartment building, as many old palazzi were converted to this use.

Bishop's townhouses were always palazzi, and the seat of a localized regime would also be so called. Many former capitals display a Ducal Palace, the seat of the local duke or lord. In Florence (just as for other strong communal governments), the seat of government was known as Palazzo della Signoria. When the Medici were made Grand Dukes of Tuscany, however, the centre of power shifted to their new residence in Palazzo Pitti, and the old centre of power began to be referred to as the Palazzo Vecchio.

Shops on the ground floor and flats at the top of a modern palazzo are not at all incongruous: historically, the ground floors of even a great family's palazzo could be trade and domestic offices often open to servants, tradesmen, customers and the public, while the smartest and most prestigious floor (known as the piano nobile) was kept for the family along with the upper floors and apartments, all of which were considered cleaner and safer than those on the ground floor. There were (and are) often separate, sometimes external, stairs to the humblest attic rooms and roofs used by the staff.

The most important royal palazzi in Italy are those in Caserta, Naples, Palermo, Turin, as well as the Quirinale Palace in Rome.

Malta

Until the sixteenth century, Malta was part of the Kingdom of Sicily, and the capital Mdina housed many palaces for the nobility, such as Palazzo Falson and Palazzo Santa Sofia. After the arrival of the Order of Saint John in 1530, the knights settled in Birgu, where part of Fort St Angelo was used as a palace for the Grand Master. The knights themselves lived in auberges, but these were more large houses rather than palaces.

When the Order began to build a new capital Valletta in 1566, a new Grandmaster's Palace and a series of new auberges were built. The auberges in Valletta are much larger than their counterparts in Birgu, and can be considered as palaces. The most important auberge still standing is Auberge de Castille, which currently houses the Office of the Prime Minister of Malta. Over the years, the Grand Masters also built a number of large residences in the countryside, such as Verdala Palace and San Anton Palace. Both of these now serve as official residences of the President of Malta.

The Archbishop of Malta has a palace in Mdina. The inquisitor also had a palace in Birgu and another in Girgenti until the abolition of the inquisition in 1798. The nobility, upper classes and individual knights of the Order built a number of private palaces, especially in Valletta, but also in the countryside. There are other palaces built by the nobility, such as, most notably Palazzo Parisio in Valletta and Palazzo Dragonara in St Julians.

Poland

The Polish aristocracy (szlachta) greatly favoured Baroque and Rococo architecture of the period. Most notable architect specializing in those styles was Dutch-born Tylman van Gameren (also Tylman Gamerski), who designed several renowned palaces, for both kings and nobles, throughout the Commonwealth. Tylman also left behind a lifelong legacy of buildings that are regarded as gems of Polish Baroque architecture. His most famous works include Krasiński Palace and Łazienki Palace, both in Warsaw, and Branicki Palace in Białystok. Other palatial architects in Poland at the time were Chrystian Piotr Aigner, Szymon Bogumił Zug, Domenico Merlini and Johann Christian Schuch.

At present, Poland possesses hundreds of varied-style palaces and residences designed by architects from all over the world. Some best examples are Wilanów Palace, Presidential Palace, Oliwa Abbot's Palace, Copper-Roof Palace, Palace of the Ministry of Revenues and Treasury, Rogalin, Jabłonowski Palace, Zamoyski Palace in Kozłówka, Lanckoroński Palace in Kurozwęki, Nieborów Palace and the Palace in Otwock Wielki. There are also several palaces resembling castles or medieval Gothic residences, most notably Moszna Castle, Książ Castle and the Warsaw Royal Castle.

Portugal

Due to its relatively small geography, most of Portugal's palaces are former royal residences. Some examples of Portuguese palaces are Mafra National Palace, Pena National Palace, Belém Palace, Ajuda National Palace, Palácio das Necessidades, Mateus Palace, Palace Hotel of Bussaco, Palácio da Regaleira, and Palácio da Brejoeira.

Romania

Palaces in Romania, as elsewhere in Europe, were originally built for royalty, nobles and bishops. Three former royal palaces in Romania are the Cotroceni Palace (now the Presidential residence); the Royal Palace in Bucharest, which now houses the National Museum of Art of Romania; and the Elisabeta Palace. Although Romania is no longer a constitutional monarchy, the current holder of the Romanian crown, HM Princess Margareta of Romania continues to reside at Elisabeta Palace in Bucharest.

Other palaces include the Crețulescu Palace in Bucharest, built for the Crețulescu family, Peles palace, built by King Carol I of Romania as a royal residence. 

The Palace of the Parliament (Casa Poporului) from Bucharest and the Palace of Culture in Iași (Palatul Culturii) are large government buildings, both purpose-built solely for government and public use.

Russia
The first palaces in Russia were built about a thousand years ago for the Grand Dukes of Kiev. These are not preserved, having been destroyed. Classical palaces were built during the reign of Tsar Peter the Great and his immediate successors. Examples of Russian palaces include:
 the Winter Palace (1732–1917) in Saint Petersburg, was the official residence of the Russian monarchs
 the Mariinsky Palace (1710–1727) in Saint Petersburg
 the Grand Kremlin Palace (1837-1849) of the Moscow Kremlin in Moscow
 the Peterhof Palace (1709–1755) in Petergof
 the Catherine Palace (1857-1862) in Tsarskoye Selo
 the Gatchina Palace (1766–1781) in Gatchina

Scandinavia

The three Scandinavian countries of Denmark, Norway and Sweden all have long monarchic histories, and possess several palaces. In Denmark Christiansborg Palace in Copenhagen was built as a royal palace, but is now only used for royal receptions; Amalienborg Palace has been the Danish royal residence since 1794. In Norway the Royal Palace in Oslo has been used as the royal residence since 1849. In Sweden the large Stockholm Palace was built in 1760, and remains the official royal residence, but at the current time is only used for official purposes while the Swedish royal family resides in the more modest Drottningholm Palace.

Serbia
The two dynasties of post-Ottoman Serbia, Karađorđević and Obrenović built numerous residences throughout their domain. The most prominent and official palaces are the Stari Dvor and the Novi Dvor (Old and New Court, respectively) in the center of Belgrade and the Royal Compound which includes the Beli Dvor and Kraljevski Dvor (Royal Palace) in the Belgrade suburb, Dedinje.

Spain
With over a thousand years of monarchic history, Spain has many palaces of its own that were built for different monarchs or nobles. Among these palaces are the Royal Palace of Madrid, also referred to as the Palacio Real. The palace is the largest palace in Europe with over 2,800 rooms but at the current time is of use for only governmental business while the royal family resides in the smaller Palacio de la Zarzuela.

In addition to the Royal Palace of Madrid, Alcázar of Seville (which mixes, with the delicate Moorish filigree, European Christian architectural styles), the Alhambra, the Monastery of San Lorenzo de El Escorial and the Royal Palace of Aranjuez, fine baroque palace is surrounded by gardens.  Currently, the royal family and prime minister live in the more modest Palace of Zarzuela and Palace of Moncloa respectively.

United Kingdom

In the United Kingdom, by tacit agreement, there have been no "palaces" other than those used as official residences by royalty or bishops, regardless of whether located in town or country. However, not all palaces use the term in their name – see Holyrood Palace. Thus the Palace of Beaulieu gained its name precisely when Thomas Boleyn sold it to Henry VIII in 1517. Previously, it had been known as Walkfares, but like several other palaces, the name stuck even once the royal connection ended.

Blenheim Palace was built, on a different site, in the grounds of the disused royal Palace of Woodstock, and the name was also part of the extraordinary honour when the house was given by a grateful nation to a great general, the Duke of Marlborough. Along with several royal and episcopal palaces in the countryside, Blenheim does demonstrate that "palace" has no specific urban connotation in English. On the use of the term "palace" in the UK, it is notable that Buckingham Palace was known as Buckingham House before it was acquired by the monarchy.

Blenheim Palace (in England) and Hamilton Palace (in Scotland, demolished in 1927) are the only non-royal and non-episcopal residences to have the word "palace" in their name, other than Dalkeith Palace in Scotland, which used to be the seat of the Dukes of Buccleuch (who descend from Charles II of England).

Turkey

After the conquest of Istanbul by Mehmed the Conqueror at 1453, construction of the Topkapı Palace was started in the year 1460 and completed in 1478. The palace was built upon a 700,000 square meter area on an Eastern Roman Acropolis located on the Istanbul Peninsula between the Sea of Marmara, Bosphorus and the Golden Horn. Topkapı Palace was the administrative, educational, and art center of the Empire for nearly four hundred years from Mehmed the Conqueror until Sultan Abdulmecid who was the thirty-first Sultan. Although Topkapi Palace was abandoned by the Ottoman Dynasty by moving to the Dolmabahçe Palace in the middle of the 19th century, Topkapı Palace retained its importance.

After the establishment of the Republic of Turkey, Topkapı Palace was transformed into a museum on 3 April 1924. It was also the first museum of the Republic of Turkey. Topkapı Palace Museum covers approximately 400,000 square meters at the present day. Topkapı Palace is separated from the city on the land-side by the Imperial Walls, which were constructed by Mehmed the Conqueror. It is separated from the city on the sea-side by the Byzantine Walls. Topkapı Palace is one of the largest palace-museums with its architectural structures, collections, and approximately 300,000 archive papers.

Other

In Continental Europe royal and episcopal palaces were not merely residences; the clerks who administered the realm or the diocese laboured there as well. (To this day many bishops' palaces house both their family apartments and their official offices.) However, unlike the "Palais du Justice" which is often encountered in the French-speaking world, modern British public administration buildings are never called "palaces"; although the formal name for the "Houses of Parliament" is the Palace of Westminster, this reflects Westminster's former role as a royal residence and centre  of administration.

In more recent years, the word has been used in a more informal sense for other large, impressive buildings, such as The Crystal Palace of 1851 (an immensely large, glazed hall erected for The Great Exhibition) and modern arenas-convention centers like Alexandra Palace.

The largest in the world is the Palace of the Parliament in Bucharest, Romania. Built during the socialist regime, no effort or expense was spared to raise this colossal neo-classic building.

See also 

 Archbishop's Palace (disambiguation)
 Castle
 Great house
 Imperial castle (Reichsburg)
 Kaiserpfalz (or Königspfalz)
 List of palaces
 Manor house
 Official residence
 Palas
 Palatine Hill
 Real estate
 World's largest palace

References 

Royal residences